Maguindanao del Norte's at-large congressional district refers to the lone congressional districts of the Philippines in the province of Maguindanao del Norte and the independent component city of Cotabato. It has been represented in the House of Representatives since 2022. It is currently represented in the 19th Congress by Sittie Shahara Mastura of Lakas-CMD.

Representation history

Notes

See also
Maguindanao's 1st congressional district

References

Congressional districts of the Philippines
At-large congressional districts of the Philippines
Politics of Maguindanao del Norte
2022 establishments in the Philippines
Congressional districts of Bangsamoro
Constituencies established in 2022